Gibbula philberti is a species of sea snail, a marine gastropod mollusk in the family Trochidae, the top snails.

Description
The size of the shell varies between 8 mm and 13 mm. The thin, small, umbilicate shell has a conical shape. The coloration is very variable, sometimes uniform dark brown or red, sometimes cinereous, longitudinally clouded with brown, or with spiral series of blackish dots. The low-conic spire is gradate. The sutures are impressed. The 6 whorls are a little gibbous just below the sutures, causing the spire to be somewhat turreted. The whorls are encircled by numerous fine unequal lirulae or striae. The periphery is obtusely angular. The base of the shell is convex, generally a little more coarsely lirate than the upper surface. The aperture is subquadrangular, oblique, and not angled at the junction of basal lip and columella. The columella is perceptibly arcuate. The large, white umbilicus is funnel-shaped and margined by one or several spiral riblets. The shell exhibits a great variation in the development of the spiral riblets. Sometimes all are small, nearly equal, and sometimes several larger ones are developed upon the upper surface.

Distribution
This species occurs in the Mediterranean Sea and in the Atlantic Ocean off Spain and Portugal.

References

 Récluz C. A., 1843: Catalogue descriptif de plusieurs nouvelles espèces de coquilles de France suivi d'observations sur quelques autres; Revue zoologique, par la Société Cuvierienne 6: 5–12, 104–112, 228–238, 257–261
 Blainville H. M. (D. de), 1828–1830: Malacozoaires ou Animaux Mollusques. [in] Faune Française; Levrault, Paris 320 p., 48 pl. [livr. 18 (1828) p. 1–80; livr. 2 (1829) p. 81–176; livr. 23 (1829) p. 177–240; livr. 28 (1830) p. 241–320]
 Philippi R. A., 1844: Enumeratio molluscorum Siciliae cum viventium tum in tellure tertiaria fossilium, quae in itinere suo observavit. Vol. 2; Eduard Anton, Halle [Halis Saxorum] iv + 303 p., pl. 13-28 
 Bucquoy E., Dautzenberg P. & Dollfus G., 1882–1886: Les mollusques marins du Roussillon. Tome Ier. Gastropodes.; Paris, J.B. Baillière & fils 570 p., 66 pl. [pp. 1–40, pl. 1–5, February 1882; pp. 41–84, pl. 6-10, August 1882; pp. 85–135, pl. 11–15, February 1883; pp. 136–196, pl. 16–20, August 1883; pp. 197–222, pl. 21–25, January 1884; pp. 223–258, pl. 26–30, February 1884; pp. 259–298, pl. 31–35, August 1884; pp. 299–342, pl. 36–40, September 1884; p. 343–386, pl. 41–45, February 1885; p. 387–418, pl. 46–50, August 1885; pp. 419–454, pl. pl. 51–60, January 1886; p. 455–486, pl. 56–60, April 1886; p. 487–570, pl. 61–66, October 1886] 
 Monterosato T. A. (di), 1888–1889: Molluschi del Porto di Palermo. Specie e varietà; Bullettino della Società Malacologica Italiana, Pisa 13 (1888[1889?]): 161–180 14 (1889): 75–81
 Pallary P., 1912: Catalogue des mollusques du littoral méditerranéen de l'Egypte; Mémoires de l'Institut d'Egypte 7: 69–207, pl. 15-18
 Coen G., 1937: Nuovo saggio di una sylloge molluscorum Adriaticorum; Memoria Reale Comitato Talassografico Italiano 240, 1–173, 10 pls
 Gofas, S.; Le Renard, J.; Bouchet, P. (2001). Mollusca, in: Costello, M.J. et al. (Ed.) (2001). European register of marine species: a check-list of the marine species in Europe and a bibliography of guides to their identification. Collection Patrimoines Naturels, 50: pp. 180–213

External links
 

philberti
Gastropods described in 1843